The Seeds of Life is the 20th co-production of MediaCorp TV and ntv7. It was scheduled to air every Monday to Thursday at 10:00pm on Malaysia's ntv7. It was shown on Mediacorp Channel 8 on weekdays at 7pm. It stars Melvin Sia , Shaun Chen & Eelyn Kok as the casts of this series.

Cast

References

Chinese-language drama television series in Malaysia
2011 Malaysian television series debuts
2011 Singaporean television series debuts
2011 Malaysian television series endings
2011 Singaporean television series endings
Singapore–Malaysia television co-productions
NTV7 original programming
Channel 8 (Singapore) original programming